Günther von Hundelshausen (born 8 October 1980) is a Namibian footballer with SK Windhoek in the Namibia Premier League. He has also played with the Namibia national football team.

References

1980 births
Living people
Namibian men's footballers
Namibian people of German descent
White Namibian people
Namibia international footballers
Namibia Premier League players
SK Windhoek players

Association footballers not categorized by position
Place of birth missing (living people)